This is a list of Bien de Interés Cultural landmarks in the Province of Biscay, Spain.

Historic groups

Bien by municipality

A 
Abadiano

B 

Balmaseda

Bermeo

 Bilbao

D 

 Durango, Biscay

E 

Elorrio

Ermua

G 

Galdames

 Galdakao

 Güeñes

 Guernica

I 

 Ispaster

K 

 Kortezubi

L 

Lekeitio

M 

Markina-Xemein

Muskiz

O 

Otxandio

Orozko

P 

Portugalete

Z 
Ziortza-Bolibar

References 

Biscay